José Antonio Fernández Fernández (May 16, 1949 – September 14, 2020), better known as Fer, was a Spanish comic artist.

He was the main promoter of the Gat Perich International Humor Prize, an award that he received in 2005.

Biography
He was born in Mansilla de las Mulas, León. His family moved to Mollet del Vallès from León when he was four years old. He graduated in History and became a teacher.

He started drawing in the magazines Mata Ratos, En Patufet and Oriflama as well as the newspaper La Prensa.

He directed the comics magazine El Papus. In 1982 he created for El Jueves the series Puti-Club, set in a brothel and later the series Historias fermosas about a group of clumsy medieval soldiers.

References

External links 
Fer in Lambiek comiclopedia

1949 births
2020 deaths
Spanish comics artists
Spanish comics writers
People from León, Spain